Thomas Throckmorton (died 1568) was an English politician.

He was a Member (MP) of the Parliament of England for Heytesbury in 1547 and Westbury in 1555. He died in 1568 and was buried at Tortworth.

His daughter Anne married Sir John Tracy (died 1591) of Toddington, Gloucestershire, and was the mother of John Tracy, 1st Viscount Tracy.

References

Year of birth missing
1568 deaths
English MPs 1547–1552
English MPs 1555
Throckmorton family
Members of the Parliament of England for constituencies in Wiltshire